The governor of Texas heads the state government of Texas. The governor is the leader of the executive and legislative branch of the state government and is the commander in chief of the Texas Military. The current governor is Greg Abbott, who took office in 2015.

Qualifications
Anyone seeking to become Governor of Texas must meet the following qualifications:
 Be at least 30 years of age
 Be a Texas resident for at least five years before the election

Governors of Texas are directly elected by registered voters in Texas and serve for a term of four years. They take office on the twentieth day of January following an election, which is also the date of expiry of the previous gubernatorial term.

History
The state's first constitution in 1845 established the office of governor, to serve for two years, but no more than four years out of every six (essentially a limit of no more than two consecutive terms). The 1861 secessionist constitution set the term start date at the first Monday in the November following the election. The 1866 constitution, adopted just after the American Civil War, increased terms to 4 years, but no more than 8 years out of every 12, and moved the start date to the first Thursday after the organization of the legislature, or "as soon thereafter as practicable". The Reconstruction-era constitution of 1869 removed the limit on terms, Texas remains one of 16 states, territory or jurisdiction (including the U.S. Territory Puerto Rico and the District of Columbia)  with no gubernatorial term limits. The present constitution of 1876 shortened terms back to two years, but a 1972 amendment increased it again to four years.

The gubernatorial election is held every four years on the first Tuesday after the first Monday in November and does not coincide with the presidential elections. The governor is sworn in on the third Tuesday of January every four years along with the lieutenant governor, so Abbott and current lieutenant governor Dan Patrick both took office on January 20, 2015.

Despite the lack of term limits, no Texas governor in the 19th or 20th century ever served more than seven and a half consecutive years in office (Allan Shivers) or eight years total service (Bill Clements, in two non-consecutive four-year terms). Former governor Rick Perry, who served from 2000 to 2015, surpassed both these records, becoming the first Texas governor to serve three consecutive four-year terms. When Perry won the general election on November 2, 2010, he joined Shivers, Price Daniel, and John Connally as the only Texas governors elected to three terms (the terms served by governors Shivers, Daniel, and Connally were two-year terms). On November 8, 2022, current governor Greg Abbott was re-elected and became the fifth Texas governor to serve three terms following Shivers, Daniel, Connally and Perry. In case of a vacancy in the office of governor, the lieutenant governor becomes governor. This rule was added only in a 1999 amendment, prior to which the lieutenant governor only acted as governor, except during the time of the 1861 constitution, which said that the lieutenant governor would be styled "Governor of the State of Texas" in case of vacancy.

See also

 List of governors of Texas
 List of Texas governors and presidents
 List of presidents of the Republic of Texas
 List of lieutenant governors of Texas
 List of Texas state agencies

References

1846 establishments in Texas